Saint-Christophe-sur-Guiers (literally Saint-Christophe on Guiers) is a commune in the Isère department in southeastern France.

La Ruchère
La Ruchère, rural district, mainly famous for cross country skiing slopes, was attached to Saint-Christophe-sur-Guiers in 1794.

Population

See also
Communes of the Isère department

References

Communes of Isère
Isère communes articles needing translation from French Wikipedia